Kempten is a railway station in the Swiss canton of Zürich and municipality of Wetzikon. The station takes its name from the nearby village of Kempten and is located on the Effretikon to Hinwil railway line.

The station is not to be confused with Kempten (Allgäu) Hauptbahnhof, which is the main station of Kempten (Allgäu, Bavaria, Germany).

History 
Between 1903 and 1939, Kempten station was also served by the Wetzikon-Meilen-Bahn (WMB), a metre gauge electric tramway that linked Kempten with Meilen, on the shores of Lake Zürich, via Wetzikon.

Service 
The station is served by Zürich S-Bahn line S3, which links  and Wetzikon via  and Effretikon. During peak hours, the S3 continues from Hardbrücke to Bülach.

References

External links
 
 Kempten station on Swiss Federal Railway's web site

Kempten
Kempten
Wetzikon